Song Chang-eui (born January 24, 1979) is a South Korean actor. Though better known as a musical theatre actor, notably in Hedwig and the Angry Inch and Gwanghwamun Love Song, Song has also starred in television dramas such as The Scales of Providence and Life Is Beautiful.

Career
Song Chang-eui began his career in musical theatre in 2002's Blue Saigon. Most famous for playing a transgender rocker in Hedwig and the Angry Inch, he also starred in the stage adaptation of Hollywood film The Graduate, the musical adaptation of romantic comedy 200 Pounds Beauty with Bada, a musical based on The Sorrows of Young Werther, popular German musical Elisabeth with Ock Joo-hyun, and Korea's first jukebox musical Gwanghwamun Younga (younga is the Korean word for "love song" or "sonata") featuring the hit songs of the late composer Lee Young-hoon.

After doing small roles on television starting 2005, Song gained fame in 2007 when he starred in Golden Bride, a drama about an inter-cultural marriage between an elite Korean man (Song) and a young Vietnamese woman (played by Lee Young-ah). He followed that with leading roles in the revenge court thriller The Scales of Providence, and the post-war film Once Upon a Time in Seoul. The latter, titled Boys Don't Cry in Korean, is about two orphaned friends (played by Song and Lee Wan) who become involved in the black market to escape poverty. Song had to lose 7 kilograms (15.4 pounds) and shave his head for his role. In 2009 he was cast as the antagonist in the Kwon Sang-woo starrer Cinderella Man, a Prince and the Pauper tale set in the world of fashion merchandising, which drew lackluster ratings.

Penned by renowned drama writer Kim Soo-hyun, the 2010 weekend family drama Life Is Beautiful became memorable and somewhat controversial for its depiction of a loving, functional relationship between two homosexual men, the first Korean show to do so in the primetime slot of a public network. The drama was a hit with average ratings of 20%, and Song earned praise for his portrayal of a gentle, kind doctor of internal medicine, who happens to be openly gay and in love with Lee Sang-woo's divorcee character.

Song and Seo Ji-hye played a married couple in melodrama A Lone Tree (the Korean title Tree that Sleeps Standing speaks to the theme of a person's desire to stay next to and support a loved one), then he had a supporting role in A Reason to Live, a contemplative film on grief and forgiveness starring Song Hye-kyo.

He returned to television in the 2011 campus romance Heartstrings (also known as You've Fallen for Me). The drama was co-produced by the Seoul Institute of the Arts, which provided its campus for filming. Song, a graduate of the arts-specialized university, said the classrooms, library and the atmosphere made him feel nostalgic. He and co-star Park Shin-hye had previously worked together as voice actors for the local hand-drawn animated film Green Days: Dinosaur and I.

Song starred in two series in 2012: Syndrome, a medical drama on cable about neurosurgeons, and The Great Seer, a historical epic about the founding of the Joseon Dynasty. Kim Soo-hyun cast him again in her 2013 weekend drama Thrice Married Woman, in which his character has lingering feelings for his ex-wife.

In 2014, Song played the titular character in police procedural Dr. Frost, adapted from the webtoon of the same title. He was then cast as a widowed father with a troubled son in the Make a Woman Cry (2015).

Filmography

Film

Television series

Television shows

Music video

Theater

Discography

Awards and nominations

References

External links
 
 Song Chang-eui Fan Cafe at Daum
 
 
 

1979 births
South Korean male musical theatre actors
South Korean male stage actors
South Korean male television actors
South Korean male film actors
Seoul Institute of the Arts alumni
Male actors from Seoul
Living people
Best New Actor Paeksang Arts Award (television) winners